The Central Committee of the 25th Congress of the Communist Party of the Soviet Union was in session from 1976 until 1981. It elected, at its 1st Plenary Session, the 25th Politburo, the 25th Secretariat and the 25th Party Control Committee of the Communist Party of the Soviet Union.

Plenums
The Central Committee was not a permanent institution. It convened plenary sessions. 12 CC plenary sessions were held between the 25th Congress and the 26th Congress. When the CC was not in session, decision-making power was vested in the internal bodies of the CC itself; that is, the Politburo and the Secretariat. None of these bodies were permanent either; typically they convened several times a month.

Composition

Members

Candidates

References

Citations

Bibliography
 

Central Committee of the Communist Party of the Soviet Union
1976 establishments in the Soviet Union
1981 disestablishments in the Soviet Union